Dromogomphus is a genus of dragonflies in the family Gomphidae. They are commonly known as Spinylegs from the spines on their legs that help in the capture of prey.

Species
Listed alphabetically.
Dromogomphus armatus  – Southeastern Spinyleg 
Dromogomphus spinosus  – Black-shouldered Spinyleg
Dromogomphus spoliatus  – Flag-tailed Spinyleg

References

Gomphidae
Anisoptera genera
Taxa named by Edmond de Sélys Longchamps